Cesare Asili (20 September 1924 – 12 October 1988) was a Ugandan Catholic priest who served as Bishop of the Roman Catholic Diocese of Lira. He was appointed as bishop of Lira on 12 July 1968	and he died as such on 12 October 1988.

Background and priesthood
Asili was born on 20 September 1924, in Moyo, Moyo District, West Nile sub-region, in the Northern Region of Uganda. He was ordained a priest on 5 June 1955.

As bishop
Asili was appointed Bishop of Lira on 12 July 1968 and was consecrated a bishop at Lira on 27 October 1968 by Cardinal Laurean Rugambwa, Bishop of Bukoba, assisted by Archbishop Emmanuel Kiwanuka Nsubuga, Archbishop of Archdiocese of Kampala and Archbishop Amelio Poggi, Titular Archbishop of Cercina. Asili died as Bishop of Lira, on 12 October 1988, at the age of 64 years.

References

External links
 About the Roman Catholic Diocese of Lira

1924 births
1988 deaths
20th-century Roman Catholic bishops in Uganda
People from Moyo District
Roman Catholic bishops of Lira